Marcos Ignacio "Nacho" Ambriz Espinoza (born 7 February 1965) is a Mexican former professional footballer and current manager of Liga MX club Toluca.

Playing career
Playing for various clubs in Mexico, Ambríz is closely associated with Club Necaxa, a club he had three spells with, and was part of two championship-winning seasons in 1994–95 and 1995–96.

He earned 64 caps and scored 6 goals for the Mexico national team between 1992 and 1995, and captained the squad at the 1994 FIFA World Cup, where he played in all four games. Ambríz also formed part of the national squad that won the 1993 CONCACAF Gold Cup.

Managerial career
Following his retirement from the playing field, Ambríz began his coaching career in 2002 with the Mexico national team, where he was the assistant to Javier Aguirre, taking part in the 2002 FIFA World Cup. Following his participation with the national team, he joined Puebla, managing only seven matches. In 2003, he was once again the assistant to Javier Aguirre at Spanish clubs Osasuna and Atlético de Madrid. They parted company when Aguirre was sacked from the Madrid position in 2009. He also had spells with San Luis – from 2009 to 2011 – and Guadalajara in 2012, only in charge for twelve matches.

Querétaro
On 4 February 2013 Adolfo Ríos, President of Querétaro, announced Ambríz as their new manager after the club sacked Sergio Bueno after a 3–0 loss to Club América at Estadio Azteca. He managed the club up until February 2015, where Ambríz was sacked after a string of bad results during the Clausura tournament.

Club América
On 26 May 2015, Ambríz was confirmed as the new manager at Club América, signing a two-year contract. He led América to a disappointing run at the FIFA Club World Cup, losing the quarter-final match to Chinese team Guangzhou Evergrande, and defeating Congolese club TP Mazembe to claim a fifth-place finish in the competition. The following year, Ambríz led América to the CONCACAF Champions League finals, defeating Tigres UANL 4–1 on aggregate, thus earning their qualification to the 2016 FIFA Club World Cup. In September, he was ranked as the 10th best coach according to Football Coach World Ranking. On 17 September, after suffering a 2–0 home defeat to León, Ambríz was sacked as manager the following day.

Necaxa
In August 2017, Ambríz was appointed manager of Necaxa, staying with the club for a year; he won the Clausura 2018 Copa MX with Necaxa, beating Toluca 1–0 in the final to end a 19-year trophy-less drought for the club.

Club León

On 18 September 2018, Ambríz was named manager of Club León, replacing Gustavo Díaz. During the 2019 Clausura, he helped León attain the records of most consecutive wins with eleven and the most points attained during the current 17-match tournament format with 41 points and a first-place finish. They faced Tigres UANL in the Clausura championship final but lost following an aggregate score of 1–0. Despite the loss, his feats with the club contributed to him being named best manager at the conclusion of the season. After a first-place finish in the Guardianes 2020 general table, on 13 December, León won the league title defeating Club Universidad Nacional with an aggregate score of 3–1, becoming Mexico's joint fourth most successful team with eight titles in total alongside Cruz Azul.

Following León's championship win, Ambríz and Club León were unable to reach an agreement for Ambríz's contractual renewal. Ambríz opted to not renew the contract, citing his desire to manage a European club.

Career statistics

International goals

Managerial statistics

Honours

Player
Necaxa
Primera División: 1994–95, 1995–96
Copa México: 1994–95
Campeón de Campeones: 1995
CONCACAF Cup Winners Cup: 1994
FIFA Club World Cup third place: 2000

Mexico
CONCACAF Gold Cup: 1993

Manager
América
CONCACAF Champions League: 2015–16

Necaxa
Copa MX: Clausura 2018

León
Liga MX: Guardianes 2020

Individual
Liga MX Best Manager: 2018–19
Liga MX Best XI Manager: Guardianes 2020

References

External links
 
 

1965 births
Living people
Footballers from Mexico City
Association football defenders
Association football utility players
Mexico under-20 international footballers
Mexico international footballers
1993 Copa América players
1993 CONCACAF Gold Cup players
1994 FIFA World Cup players
1995 King Fahd Cup players
1995 Copa América players
CONCACAF Gold Cup-winning players
Liga MX players
Salamanca F.C. footballers
Club Necaxa footballers
Club León footballers
Club Puebla players
Atlante F.C. footballers
Club Celaya footballers
Mexican football managers
Club Puebla managers
San Luis F.C. managers
C.D. Guadalajara managers
Querétaro F.C. managers
Club América managers
Liga MX managers
Segunda División managers
SD Huesca managers
Mexican expatriate football managers
Mexican expatriate sportspeople in Spain
Expatriate football managers in Spain
Mexican footballers